Dark Shadows: The Skin Walkers is a Big Finish Productions original dramatic reading based on the long-running American horror soap opera series Dark Shadows.

Plot 
Quentin Collins meets the terrifying Skin Walkers in nineteenth century New York.

Cast
Quentin Collins – David Selby
Angelique Bouchard Collins – Lara Parker

External links
Dark Shadows - The Skin Walkers

Dark Shadows audio plays
2008 audio plays
Works by Scott Handcock